Cody Michael Gibson (born September 11, 1987) is an American mixed martial artist who formerly competed in the Bantamweight division of the Ultimate Fighting Championship and last competed in Eagle FC.

Background
Born in Blackwell, Oklahoma, in 1987, Gibson and his brother Keith were adopted in 1989 and moved west, settling in the small town of Visalia, California. As an adult, Gibson found out through social media that he has also a sister and met his biological parents for the first time in 2018.

After a standout high school wrestling career at Mount Whitney High School, Gibson went on to wrestle at Bakersfield College and Menlo College where he was a two time JC All American finishing 2nd at the California JUCO state championships.

Mixed martial arts career

Regional circuit
While home for the summer during college, Cody's friend invited him to a mixed martial arts gym in Exeter, California, to give it a try.  He quickly found out that he enjoyed fighting and took his first professional fight only a few weeks after beginning training.  Over the course of the next two years, Cody, still wrestling in college, would take a total of three professional fights, despite not having been trained extensively in any discipline other than wrestling.  Still, he managed to begin his MMA career with a 3–0 start.  After graduating from college, Cody had a lot of regrets about not meeting his potential as a college wrestler.  Upon moving back to Visalia, California, he found a local gym called Elite Team Visalia under head coach, judo and jiu-jitsu black belt Tom Knox.  Over the next several years, Cody fought on the local circuit while learning the arts of Brazilian jiu-jitsu, muay thai, and boxing.  He fought on shows such as Porterville, California's The Warriors Cage, Lemoore, California's Tachi Palace Fights, and made appearances for Nick Diaz's foray into promoting show called WAR MMA as well as for AXSTV's Titan Fighting Championship.

Ultimate Fighting Championship
In February 2014, riding a six-fight win streak, Gibson was signed by the UFC as a short-notice replacement to fight fellow newcomer Aljamain Sterling on February 22, 2014 at UFC 170. Gibson lost the fight via unanimous decision.

Gibson faced Johnny Bedford on June 28, 2014 at UFC Fight Night 44, replacing an injured Rani Yahya.  Gibson won the fight via TKO 38 seconds into the first round.

Gibson faced Manvel Gamburyan on September 27, 2014 at UFC 178.  Gibson lost the fight via submission in the second round

Gibson faced Douglas Silva de Andrade on February 22, 2015 at UFC Fight Night 61. He lost the fight by unanimous decision and was subsequently released from the promotion.

Post-UFC career
In April 2016 Gibson made his return to the cage after a year off due to injury.  Gibson defeated Justin Linn by unanimous decision at The Warriors Cage: Showdown.

Gibson then went on to defeat Rolando Velasco to win the Tachi Palace Fights Bantamweight title via unanimous decision at Tachi Palace, Lemoore, California, on May 19, 2016 in the 5 round main event at TPF27: Mayhem.

In September 2016 it was announced that Gibson will defend his TPF championship against Kyle Reyes at Tachi Palace Fights 29 on November 3rd.  Gibson won the fight by knock out in the second round.

On May 18, 2017 Gibson vacated his Bantamweight title and moved up a weight class to fight Adrian Diaz for the TPF Featherweight Championship. He lost the fight via third round submission and retired afterwards.

Return from retirement
On September 28th, 2018, Gibson fought in the main event for Legacy Fighting Alliance against Gustavo Erak. He won the fight by unanimous decision. 

Gibson signed to participate in the Featherweight division of 2019 Professional Fighters League season. However, Gibson was sidelined with bicep and shoulder surgery and was not able to compete.

Gibson was scheduled to face John Dodson on July 30, 2021 at XMMA 2. Dodson unfortunately pulled out of the fight due to being involved in a car accident. Canadian prospect Louie Sanoudakis took his place. Gibson won the fight by knock out in just 44 seconds.

The bout with Dodson was rescheduled to take place at XMMA 3 on October 23, 2021. Gibson won the fight by unanimous decision.

Gibson faced Ray Borg on January 28, 2022 at Eagle FC 44: Spong vs. Kharitonov. He lost the bout via unanimous decision.

Gibson faced fellow UFC veteran Francisco Rivera on November 19, 2022 at Up Next Fighting 3: Rivera vs. Gibson. He won the bout via third round submission with an arm triangle choke to become the first Up Next Fighting Bantamweight Champion.

Personal life
Aside from fighting, Gibson is a U.S. History and economics teacher.

He has two daughters.

Championships and accomplishments

Mixed martial arts
Tachi Palace Fights
TPF Bantamweight Championship (one time)
One successful title defense
Up Next Fighting
UNF Bantamweight Champion (one time; current; first)

Mixed martial arts record

|-
|Win
|align=center|19–8
|Francisco Rivera
|Submission (arm-triangle choke)
|UNF 3: Rivera vs. Gibson
|
|align=center|3
|align=center|2:42
|Commerce, California, United States
|
|-
|Loss
|align=center|18–8
|Ray Borg
|Decision (unanimous)
|Eagle FC 44
|
|align=center|3
|align=center|5:00
|Miami, Florida, United States
|
|-
|Win
|align=center|18–7 
|John Dodson
|Decision (unanimous)
|XMMA 3: Vice City: Gibson vs Dodson
|
|align=center|3
|align=center|5:00
|Miami, Florida, United States
| 
|-
|Win
|align=center|17–7 
|Louie Sanoudakis
|KO (punches)
|XMMA 2: Saunders vs. Nijem
|
|align=center|1
|align=center|0:44
|Greenville, South Carolina, United States
| 
|-
|Win
| align=center| 16–7
| Gustavo Erak 
| Decision (unanimous)
| LFA 51
| 
| align=center| 3
| align=center| 5:00
| Fresno, California, United States 
|  
|-
| Loss
| align=center| 15–7
| Adrian Diaz 
| Submission (guillotine choke)
| Tachi Palace Fights 31
| 
| align=center|3 
| align=center|1:46
| Lemoore, California, United States 
|  
|-
|Win
| align=center| 15–6
| Kyle Reyes 
| KO (punches)
| Tachi Palace Fights 29
| 
| align=center| 2
| align=center| 0:21
| Lemoore, California, United States 
|  
|-
| Win
| align=center| 14–6
| Rolando Velasco
| Decision (unanimous)
| Tachi Palace Fights 27: Mayhem
| 
| align=center| 5
| align=center| 5:00
| Lemoore, California, United States
|  
|-
| Win
| align=center| 13–6
| Justin Linn
| Decision (unanimous)
| TWC 24: Showdown
| 
| align=center| 3
| align=center| 5:00
| Porterville, California, United States
| 
|-
| Loss
| align=center| 12–6
| Douglas Silva de Andrade
| Decision (unanimous)
| UFC Fight Night: Bigfoot vs. Mir
| 
| align=center| 3
| align=center| 5:00
| Porto Alegre, Brazil
| 
|-
| Loss
| align=center| 12–5
| Manvel Gamburyan
| Submission (guillotine choke)
| UFC 178
| 
| align=center| 2
| align=center| 4:56
| Las Vegas, Nevada, United States
| 
|-
| Win
| align=center| 12–4
| Johnny Bedford
| TKO (punch)
| UFC Fight Night: Swanson vs. Stephens
| 
| align=center| 1
| align=center| 0:38
| San Antonio, Texas, United States
| 
|-
| Loss
| align=center| 11–4
| Aljamain Sterling
| Decision (unanimous)
| UFC 170
| 
| align=center| 3
| align=center| 5:00
| Las Vegas, Nevada, United States
| 
|-
| Win
| align=center| 11–3
| Evan Esguerra
| Decision (unanimous)
| Tachi Palace Fights 17: Fall Brawl
| 
| align=center| 3
| align=center| 5:00
| Lemoore, California, United States
| 
|-
| Win
| align=center| 10–3
| Chad George
| Submission (guillotine choke)
| TWC 18
| 
| align=center| 1
| align=center| 4:37
| Porterville, California, United States
|Catchweight (140 lb) bout.
|-
| Win
| align=center| 9–3
| Darin Cooley
| TKO (punches and knee)
| War MMA 1
| 
| align=center| 3
| align=center| 3:46
| Stockton, California, United States
| 
|-
| Win
| align=center| 8–3
| Junior Villanueva
| Submission (rear-naked choke)
| TWC 16
| 
| align=center| 2
| align=center| 3:30
| Porterville, California, United States
| 
|-
| Win
| align=center| 7–3
| Andrew Whitney
| Decision (unanimous)
| Titan FC 24
| 
| align=center| 3
| align=center| 5:00
| Kansas City, Kansas, United States
|Return to Bantamweight.
|-
| Win
| align=center| 6–3
| Justin Santistevan
| Submission (guillotine choke)
| EFWC - The Untamed 2
| 
| align=center| 1
| align=center| 1:03
| Anaheim, California, United States
|Flyweight debut.
|-
| Loss
| align=center| 5–3
| Casey Olson
| Decision (unanimous)
| Tachi Palace Fights 12: Second Coming
| 
| align=center| 3
| align=center| 5:00
| Lemoore, California, United States
| 
|-
| Loss
| align=center| 5–2
| Ulysses Gomez
| Submission (guillotine choke)
| TPF 11: Redemption
| 
| align=center| 3
| align=center| 2:43
| Lemoore, California, United States
| 
|-
| Win
| align=center| 5–1
| Walel Watson
| TKO (punches and elbows)
| TPF 9: The Contenders
| 
| align=center| 2
| align=center| 4:09
| Lemoore, California, United States
| 
|-
| Win
| align=center| 4–1
| Art Becerra
| Decision (unanimous) 
| TWC 10
| 
| align=center| 3
| align=center| 5:00
| Porterville, California, United States
| 
|-
| Loss
| align=center| 3–1
| David Bollea
| Submission (armlock) 
| TPF 5: Stars and Strikes
| 
| align=center| 2
| align=center| 0:31
| Lemoore, California, United States
| 
|-
| Win
| align=center| 3–0
| Ray Cervera
| Decision (unanimous)
| TPF 2: Brawl in the Hall
| 
| align=center| 3
| align=center| 5:00
| Lemoore, California, United States
| 
|-
| Win
| align=center| 2–0
| Dustin Rocha
| TKO (punches)
| TPF: Best of Both Worlds
| 
| align=center| 2
| align=center| 0:48
| Lemoore, California, United States
| 
|-
| Win
| align=center| 1–0
| Billy Terry
| TKO (punches)
| GC 81 - Lights Out
| 
| align=center| 1
| align=center| 1:58
| Porterville, California, United States
|

See also
 List of current UFC fighters
 List of male mixed martial artists

References

External links
UFC Profile

1987 births
Living people
American male mixed martial artists
Bantamweight mixed martial artists
Mixed martial artists utilizing collegiate wrestling
Mixed martial artists utilizing Brazilian jiu-jitsu
People from Blackwell, Oklahoma
People from Visalia, California
Ultimate Fighting Championship male fighters
American practitioners of Brazilian jiu-jitsu
American male sport wrestlers
Amateur wrestlers